Oluwakorede David "Korede" Osundina (born February 13, 2004) is an American professional soccer player who plays as a forward for USL Championship side Orange County SC.

Career

Youth
Osundina was born in Naperville, Illinois, but raised in Redmond, Washington, where he played six seasons with Crossfire Premier. In September 2020, Osundina made the move to join the Barça Residency Academy in Casa Grande, Arizona to compete in the MLS Next. During that time, he played for the club's U19 team that advanced to the Round of 16 in the 2021 MLS Next Cup after entering the tournament as the undefeated No.1 seed. Osundina verbally committed to playing college soccer at Cornell University in 2022.

Professional
On January 20, 2022, Osundina signed a multi-year contract with USL Championship club Orange County SC. He debuted for the club on March 12, 2022 as an 76th–minute substitute during a 1–2 loss to Colorado Springs Switchbacks.

References

External links
Orange County SC Profile

2004 births
Living people
American soccer players
Association football forwards
Orange County SC players
People from Redmond, Washington
Soccer players from Washington (state)
USL Championship players
United States men's youth international soccer players